The Philam Life Theater, also styled Philamlife Theater, was a performing arts venue at 1440 United Nations Avenue in the Ermita district of Manila, the Philippines. It opened in 1961 as the Philam Life Auditorium and was designed by Filipino architect Carlos Arguelles as part of the corporate headquarters for the Philam Life insurance company (now AIA Philippines). The International Style concert hall in the eastern annex of the Philam Life Building is known for its superior acoustics and elegant interior. It served as Manila's cultural center for almost a decade and has played host to world-renowned musicians, choirs and symphony orchestras over its 53-year history, including Renata Tebaldi, Franco Corelli, Marian Anderson, Pinchas Zukerman and Cecile Licad. The theater also served as the home of the Manila Symphony Orchestra, the Manila Philharmonic Orchestra and the Philippine Educational Theater Association.

In 2012, SM Investments subsidiary SM Development Corp. purchased the entire  Philam Life Manila complex including its theater and announced its plans to redevelop the property into a condominium complex. Philam Life vacated the property and relocated its headquarters to Bonifacio Global City in April 2013 (now in AIA Tower), and its customer service center to Bay City in June 2013.

Facility

The Philam Life Theater is a proscenium theatre with a seating capacity of 780. It has a rectangular floor area in front of the stage with curved walls and a large concealed cavity above the ceiling where elegant glass light panels hang. Its walls were adorned by narra relief carvings which encompassed the entire length of the theater's orchestra. The  multi-panel carved narra murals depicting Philippine folklore, traditional musical instruments, and mythical characters like Maria Makiling and Malakas at Maganda was designed by Filipino sculptor José Alcántara in 1961 and created with the help of local artists from Paete, Laguna. They are now housed at the National Museum of Fine Arts following the closure of the Philam Life complex for redevelopment.

Narra wood bricks embellish the walls above the murals and a cementitious panel form the stage's ceiling. The theater's acoustic design was carried out by BBN Technologies (Bolt, Beranek and Newman) who also created the acoustics for the United Nations General Assembly Hall in New York City, Lincoln Center’s David Geffen Hall and the Joseph Meyerhoff Symphony Hall in Baltimore.

Status
An online petition was launched in March 2013 by French conductor and former Philippine Philharmonic Orchestra musical director Olivier Ochanine calling for SM Development Corp. to spare the theater from demolition following news that the 52-year old complex was purchased for redevelopment. The petition which received more than 10,000 signatures in its first month argued that the theater "has some of the best acoustics for Manila's orchestras, choirs, and solo musical artists and its destruction would be a gigantic loss for Filipino culture and heritage." Petitioners also argued the theater's rich history as Manila's cultural center for close to 10 years prior to the opening of the Tanghalang Pambansa, the many artists and musicians who call the theater home, and its unmatched sound quality that rivals even the most modern theaters in the region.

Initial reports that the theater and the entire Philam complex was to be converted into a shopping mall have been denied by the SM group. The group came out with a statement confirming the purchase of the property and that it plans to turn it into a residential condominium complex although it has not decided on what to do with the theater. Following a dialogue with the petitioner Ochanine in April 2013, SMDC chief executive officer Henry Sy Jr. announced its decision to preserve the Philam Life Theater and said that the hall may be moved within the complex to complement the overall master plan of the property, but that "the complete theater including all its elements and most especially its acoustics will be preserved in close consultation with the country’s music, acoustics and design experts."

The theater opened its doors for the last time in April 2013 with the staging of the classical music concert Elegantly Brahms with Sofya Gulyak and the Philippine Philharmonic Orchestra.

The entire Philam Complex has started its demolition in August 5, 2020 amidst the COVID-19 pandemic in the Philippines. It ended in 2021.

References

Theaters in Manila
Buildings and structures in Ermita
Theatres completed in 1961
Demolished buildings and structures in the Philippines
Buildings and structures demolished in 2020